Union of Social Democrats (USD; ; Soyuz sotsial-demokratov, SSD) was an all-Russian non-governmental organization founded on 20 October 2007 by former Soviet leader Mikhail Gorbachev.

The party had its roots in the former Social Democratic Party of Russia, which lost its official status in April 2007 due to low party membership.

The Union of Social Democrats skipped the 2007 general election, in order to concentrate on its ultimate goal: to become a mass political party by 2011.

In September 2008, Gorbachev announced the formation of the Independent Democratic Party of Russia, although the plans later fell through.

See also
Independent Democratic Party of Russia
List of political parties in Russia
Politics of Russia
Russian Social-Democratic Union of Youth

References

External links

2007 establishments in Russia
2013 disestablishments in Russia
Mikhail Gorbachev
Organizations established in 2007
Socialist International
Socialist organizations in Russia